Contract Sejm is a term commonly applied to the Sejm ("parliament") elected in the Polish parliamentary elections of 1989. The contract refers to an agreement reached by the Polish United Workers' Party and the Solidarność ("solidarity") movement during the Polish Round Table Agreement. The final agreement was signed on April 5, 1989. As a result, real political power was vested in a newly created bicameral legislature and in a president who would be the chief executive. Solidarność became a legitimate and legal political party.

Perhaps the most important decision reached during the talks was to allow for partially free elections to be held in Poland. All seats to the newly created Senate of Poland were to be elected democratically, as were 161 seats (35 percent of the total) in Sejm. The remaining 65% of the seats were reserved for the Communist Party and its satellite parties. In addition, all 35 seats elected via the country-wide list were reserved for the Party's candidates provided they gained a certain quota of support. This was to ensure that the most notable leaders of the Party were elected.

The outcome of the election was largely unpredictable. After all, Poland had not had a free and fair election since the 1928, so there was little precedent to go by. It was clear that the Communists were unpopular, but there were no hard numbers as to how low support for them would actually fall. The Communist government still had control over most major media outlets and employed sports and television celebrities for candidates, as well as successful local personalities and businesspeople. Some members of the opposition were worried that such tactics would gain enough votes from the less educated segment of the population to give the Communists the legitimacy that they craved.

The election of June 4, 1989 (and the second round of June 18) brought a landslide victory to Solidarność: 99% of all the seats in the Senate and all of the possible seats in the Sejm. Out of 100 seats in the Senate, 99 were won by Solidarity and 1 by an independent candidate. Out of 35 seats of the country-wide list, only one was gained by the Party candidate (Adam Zieliński) and one by a United People's Party satellite party candidate, while the remainder were taken by the Solidarity in the second run. Altogether, out of 161 seats eligible, Solidarity took 160.

The turnout was surprisingly low: only 62.7% in the first round and 25% in the second. The outcome was a major surprise to both the Party and Solidarity. Only a few days before June 4 the party Central Committee was discussing the possible reaction of the Western world should Solidarity not win a single seat. At the same time the Solidarity leaders were trying to prepare some set of rules for the non-party MPs in a Communist-dominated parliament, as it was expected that the Solidarity would win not more than 20 seats.

Although the elections were not entirely democratic, they paved the way for the creation of Tadeusz Mazowiecki's cabinet and a peaceful transition to democracy, which was confirmed after the Polish parliamentary elections of 1991.

The Contract Sejm's opening session took place on 5 July 1989

References

 
 
 

Solidarity (Polish trade union)
Sejm
1989 in Poland
History of Poland (1989–present)
Political history of Poland